Meru is a town in Klang District, Selangor, Malaysia.

Industry
Meru is home to Top Glove which is the nation's largest producer of latex gloves.  Numerous small-medium industrial complex are located in Meru which is less than 10 km from the heart of Klang.

This town is currently losing its prominence, especially the Klang Parade as there are newer towns in Klang. One location that is currently very popular is Bandar Bukit Tinggi, a new and modern town area in the south of Klang. Because of that, Klang Parade is struggling to get customers.

Transport
However, due to the recent property developments at nearby areas such as Setia Alam (part of Shah Alam), Klang Sentral and Bandar Bukit Raja, Meru is all set to see a raise in traffic volume.

References 

Klang District
Towns in Selangor